Chris Hegarty (born 13 August 1992) is a Northern Irish footballer who plays as a defender for NIFL Premiership side Crusaders.

Club career
Born in Dungannon, Hegarty began his career at youth level with local team Dungannon Swifts. He joined Millwall in 2008 after being scouted playing for the Northern Ireland under-16 team. He captained both the youth and reserve teams (winning the youth league in the process), before joining Hibernian on trial in 2010. He was offered contracts by both Hibs and fellow Scottish Premier League side Rangers, and opted to sign for the latter, revealing "I fulfilled an ambition by playing for the club I grew up supporting".

Rangers
Although he made several appearances on the substitutes bench in the 2011–12 season, it was not until May 2012 that he made his first-team appearance, in a friendly against Linfield in May 2012. In the summer of 2012, Hegarty became the first player to sign for Rangers after their demotion to the fourth tier of Scottish football. He made 28 appearances in total during the 2012–13 season as Rangers won the Scottish Third Division. He scored his first Rangers goal in the opening game of the 2013–14 season, tapping in after two minutes in a 4–1 win over Brechin City. His season was blighted by injury however, and he would make just one other appearance that season.

Linfield
In May 2014 Hegarty signed for Linfield on a two-year contract. He was also made club captain. However his time there was blighted by injuries, and in February 2016 he joined hometown club Dungannon Swifts on loan for the remainder of the 2015–16 season.

Dungannon Swifts
Hegarty signed for Dungannon permanently in May 2016. In February 2018, he helped the Swifts to win the Northern Ireland Football League Cup (their first senior trophy), after a 3–1 victory over Ballymena United in the final. Hegarty was made Dungannon captain in December 2018.

Crusaders
In May 2019, Hegarty joined Crusaders on a three-year deal. He scored on his competitive debut, a 2–0 victory against B36 Tórshavn in the UEFA Europa League.

International career
Hegarty won eight caps for Northern Ireland at under-19 level and four caps at under-21 level.

Career statistics

Honours
Rangers
Scottish Third Division: 2012–13

Dungannon Swifts
Northern Ireland Football League Cup: 2017–18

Crusaders
Irish Cup: 2021–22

References

1992 births
Living people
Association footballers from Northern Ireland
Association football defenders
Dungannon Swifts F.C. players
Millwall F.C. players
Rangers F.C. players
Linfield F.C. players
Crusaders F.C. players
NIFL Premiership players
Scottish Professional Football League players
Northern Ireland under-21 international footballers